Marie Louise or Marie-Louise is a French feminine compound given name. In other languages, it may take one of several alternate forms:
 Maria Luiza (Bulgarian, Portuguese)
 Maria Luisa (Italian, Spanish)
 Maria Luise (German)
 Maria Louisa, Mary Louise or Mary Lou (English). 

Notable people with the name include:

Literature
Marie Louise Andrews (1849–1891), American writer
Marie-Louise Belarbi (1928–2020), French-Moroccan writer
Marie-Louise Boudât (1916–1968), French letterist and author
Marie Louise Burgess-Ware (born 1870), American writer
Marie-Louise Colomb (1892–1965), Swiss writer
Marie-Louise Dreier (born 1936), Belgian poet
Marie-Louise Fitzpatrick (born 1962), Irish children's author and illustrator
Marie-Louise af Forsell (1823–1852), Swedish diarist
Marie Louise von François (1817– 1893), German writer
Marie-Louise Gagneur (1832–1902), French feminist writer
Marie-Louise Gay (born 1952), Canadian children's writer and illustrator
Marie-Louise Haumont (1919–2012), Belgian writer
Marie-Louise Jensen (born 1964), English children's author
Marie Louise Lévêque de Vilmorin (1902–1969), French novelist and poet
Marie Louise Hamilton Mack (1870–1935), Australian poet
Marie-Louise Marmette (1870–1928), Canadian author
Marie Louise Mignot (1712–1790), French literary figure
Marie-Louise Mumbu (born 1975), Congolese journalist
Marie Louise de la Ramee (1839–1908), English novelist
Marie Louise Shedlock (1854–1935), French storyteller
Marie Louise Victoire, La Rochejacquelein (1772–1857), French memoirist

Music

Marie-Louise-Taos Amrouche (1913–1976), Algerian singer and writer
Marie-Louise Cantotti (1910–1999), American opera singer
Marie-Louise Cébron-Norbens (1888–1958), French opera singer
Marie-Louise Dähler, Swiss harpsichordist
Marie-Louise Damien (1889–1978), French singer and actress
Marie-Louise Desmatins (fl. 1682–1708), French opera singer
Marie-Louise Gilles (born 1937), French opera singer
Marie-Louise Girod (1915–2014), French organist and composer
Marie-Louise Emma Cécile Lajeunesse (1847–1930), Canadian-British opera singer
Marie Louise Marcadet (1758–1804), Swedish opera singer and a dramatic stage actress

Nobility and royalty

Marie Louise Gonzaga (1611–1667), Princess of Gonzague-Nevers, daughter of Charles I, Duke of Mantua and Catherine of Guise
Marie Louise d'Aspremont (1652/1652–1692), daughter of Charles II, Count d’Aspremont, wife of Charles IV, Duke of Lorraine
Marie Louise of Orléans (1662–1689), daughter of Philippe I, Duke of Orléans, queen consort of Charles II of Spain
Marie Louise of Hesse-Kassel (1688–1765), daughter of Charles I, Landgrave of Hesse-Kassel, wife of John William Friso, Prince of Orange
Marie Louise Élisabeth d'Orléans (1695–1719), daughter of Philippe II, Duke of Orléans, wife of Charles, Duke of Berry (1686–1714)
Marie Louise Adélaïde d'Orléans (1698–1743), daughter of Philippe II, Duke of Orléans
Marie Louise de Rohan (1720–1803), daughter of Jules de Rohan, Prince of Soubise, wife of Gaston, Count of Marsan
Marie Louise de La Tour d'Auvergne (1725–1793), daughter of Charles Godefroy de La Tour d'Auvergne, wife of Jules, Prince of Guéméné
Marie Louise Élisabeth of France (1727–1759), daughter of King Louis XV of France, wife of Philip, Duke of Parma
Marie Louise of France (1728–1733), daughter of Louis XV of France
Countess Maria Louise Albertine of Leiningen-Dagsburg-Falkenburg (1729–1818), daughter of Count Christian Karl Reinhard of Leiningen-Dagsburg-Falkenburg, wife of Prince George William of Hesse-Darmstadt
Princess Marie Louise of Savoy (1749–1792), daughter of Louis Victor, Prince of Carignano, wife of Louis Alexandre, Prince de Lamballe
Marie Louise of Bourbon-Parma (1751–1819), daughter of Philip, Duke of Parma, queen consort of Charles IV of Spain
Marie-Louise Coidavid (1778–1851), Queen of the Kingdom of Haiti
Marie Louise, Duchess of Parma (1791–1847), the second wife of Napoléon Bonaparte and Empress of the French
Duchess Marie Louise of Mecklenburg-Schwerin (1803–1862), daughter of Frederick Louis of Mecklenburg-Schwerin, wife of Georg, Duke of Saxe-Altenburg
Princess Marie Luise Charlotte of Hesse-Kassel (1814–1895), daughter of Prince William of Hesse-Kassel, wife of Prince Frederick Augustus of Anhalt-Dessau
Countess Marie Louise Larisch von Moennich (1858–1940), illegitimate daughter of Ludwig Wilhelm, Duke in Bavaria
Princess Marie Louise of Bourbon-Parma (1870–1899), daughter of Robert I, Duke of Parma, princess consort of Ferdinand I of Bulgaria
Princess Marie Louise of Schleswig-Holstein (1872–1956), daughter of Prince Christian of Schleswig-Holstein and Princess Helena of the United Kingdom, wife of Prince Aribert of Anhalt
Princess Marie Louise of Hanover (1879–1948), daughter of Ernest Augustus, Crown Prince of Hanover, wife of Prince Maximilian of Baden
Princess Marie Louise of Orléans (1896–1973), daughter of Prince Emmanuel of Orléans, Duke of Vendôme, wife of Prince Philip of Bourbon-Two Sicilies
Princess Marie-Louise of Madagascar (1897–1948), last heir apparent and pretender to the throne of the Kingdom of Madagascar
Princess Marie Louise of Bulgaria (born 1933), daughter of Boris III of Bulgaria, wife of Prince Karl of Leiningen

Politics

Marie Louise Berneri (1918–1949), Italian activist and author
Marie Louise Bottineau Baldwin (1863-1952), Native American rights activist
Marie-Louise Coleiro Preca (born 1958), former President of Malta
Marie-Louise Correa (born 1943), Senegalese politician
Marie-Louise Fort (born 1950), member of the National Assembly of France
Marie-Louise Kehoe (born 1928), American politician
Marie-Louise Loubet (1843–1925),  wife of the President of France Émile Loubet
Marie-Louise Mwange (born 1961), Congolese politician
Marie-Rose Morel (1972–2011), Flemish-Belgian politician
Marie Louise Nignan-Bassolet, Burkinabe politician
Marie-Louise O'Donnell (born 1952), Irish politician
Marie-Louise Puech-Milhau (1876–1966), French pacifist
Marie-Louise Potter (born 1959), member of the National Assembly of Seychelles
Marie-Louise Rochebillard (1860–1936), French trade unionist
Marie-Louise Sibazuri (born 1960), Burundian activist
Marie-Louise Tardif, Canadian politician
Marie Louise Yovanovitch (born 1958), American diplomat

Religion
Marie Louise Burke (1912–2004), American Hindu religious writer
Marie Louise Clinton (1871–1934), American church leader
Marie Louise De Meester (1857–1928), French missionary
Marie Louise Habets (1905–1986), Belgian nurse and religious sister
Marie-Louise-Élisabeth de Lamoignon de Molé de Champlâtreux (1763–1825), French Catholic saint
Marie Louise Trichet (1684–1759), French Catholic saint
Marie-Louise Valade (1808–1861), Canadian Catholic nun

Science and engineering
Marie-Louise Bauchot (born 1928), French ichthyologist
Marie-Louise de Beauvoir (1776–1855), Belgian educator
Marie Louise Marguerite Belèze (1851-1913), French botanist
Marie Louise Compernolle (1909–2005), Flemish chemical engineer
Marie-Louise Dubreil-Jacotin (1905–1972), French mathematician
Marie-Louise von Franz (1915–1998), Swiss psychologist
Marie Louise Killick (1914–1964), English audio engineer
Marie-Louise Michelsohn (born 1941), American mathematician
Marie-Louise Nosch (born 1970), French archaeologist
Marie-Louise Paris (1889–1969), French engineer
Marie-Louise Saboungi (born 1948), American physicist
Marie Louise Stig Sørensen (born 1954), Danish archaeologist
Marie-Louise Sjoestedt (1900–1940), French linguist and literary scholar
Marie Louise Uhr (1923–2001), Australian biochemist

Sports

Marie-Louise Bévis (born 1972), French sprinter
Marie-Louise Castenskiold (born 1960), Danish equestrian
Marie-Louise Dräger (born 1981), German Olympic rower
Marie-Louise Eta (born 1991), German footballer
Marie-Louise Hamrin (born 1957), Swedish long-distance runner
Marie-Louise Horn (1912–1991), German tennis player
Marie-Louise Hosdey (born 1945), Belgian sports shooter
Marie Louise Kirkland (1899–1999), American sports commentator
Marie-Louise Ledru, French long-distance runner
Marie-Louise Linssen-Vaessen (1928–1993), Dutch freestyle swimmer
Marie-Louise Perrenoud (born 1947), French speed skater
Marie-Louise Pierre (born 1955), Haitian sprinter
Marie Louise Reilly (born 1980), Irish rugby union player
Marie Sirois (1865–1920), erroniously known as Marie Louise Sirois, French-Canadian strongwoman
Marie Louise Steffensen (born 1996), Danish badminton player

Visual arts
Marie Louise Amiet (1879–1944), French painter and illustrator
Marie Louise Asseu (1966–2016), Ivorian actress, director and film producer
Marie Louise Anna Beaudet (1859–1947), Canadian actress and dancer
Marie-Louise Bousquet (1885–1975), French fashion journalist
Maria Luise Katharina Breslau (1856–1927), Swiss painter
Marie Louise Brimberg (born 1948), Danish photographer
Marie-Louise Bruyère (1884–1959?), French fashion designer
Marie-Louise Carven (1909–2015), French fashion designer
Marie-Louise Ekman (born 1944), Swedish painter and filmmaker
Marie Louise Fuller (1862–1928), American actress and dancer
Marie-Louise Hairs (1912–1998), Belgian art historian
Marie Louise Kold (born 1974), Danish artist
Marie-Louise Laleyan (1935–2014), American architect
Marie-Louise von Motesiczky (1906–1996), Austrian painter
Marie-Louise Jeanne Nicolle Mourer (1920–1967), French film actress
Marie-Louise Pichot (1885–1947), French painter
Marie Louise Thomsen (1823–1907), Danish photographer
Marie-Louise-Elisabeth Vigee-Lebrun (1755–1842), French painter

Other
Marie-Louise Arconati-Visconti (1840–1923), French philanthropist, salonnière and art collector
Marie-Louise Ayres (born 1963), Australian librarian
Marie-Louise Bertschinger (1910/1911–1970), Swiss humanitarian
Marie-Louise Bouglé (1883-1936), French feminist, librarian, and archivist
Marie-Louise Charles (1765–after 1807), French businesswoman and former slave
Marie-Louise Charpentier (1905-1998), French Resistance member
Marie-Louise Cloarec (1917–1945), French Resistance member
Marie-Louise Dissard (1881–1957), French Resistance member
Marie-Louise Driancourt (1887–1914), French pilot
Marie Louise Garibaldi (1934–2016), American jurist.
Marie-Louise Giraud (1903–1943), French abortionist
Marie-Louise Jaÿ (1838–1925), French businesswoman
Marie-Louise Lachapelle (1769–1821), French midwife
Marie-Louise Lacoste (1849–1919), Canadian philanthropist
Marie-Louise Marchand-Thébault (died 2007), French historian and archivist
Marie Louise Madeleine Victoire d'Argenton (1684-1749), royal mistress of Philippe II, Duke of Orléans
Marie-Louise Meilland (1920–1987), French rose breeder and business owner
Marie-Louise Meilleur (1880–1998), the oldest validated Canadian ever
Marie Louise Scudder Myrick (1854–1934), American newspaper owner
Marie-Louise O'Murphy (1737–1814), mistress of King Louis XV of France
Marie-Louise Theile (born 1966), Australian news presenter
Marie Louise Angélique Aimée Caroillon des Tillières (1797–1853), French heiress
Marie-Louise Tromel (1717–1755), French Breton bandit
Marie-Louise Victoire Girardin (1754–1794), French explorer

See also
Anne Marie Louise (disambiguation)
Louise-Marie
Maria Luisa
Joseph-Guillaume Barthe (1816–1893), French writer who used the pseudonym 'Marie Louise'

Compound given names
French feminine given names